The Tyrrell 023 was a Formula One car designed by Harvey Postlethwaite and Mike Gascoyne for the Tyrrell team for use in the 1995 Formula One season. Driven by Ukyo Katayama and Mika Salo, the best finish achieved by the 023 was fifth (twice).

Design and development
Designed by Harvey Postlethwaite and Mike Gascoyne, the 023 featured a new hydraulic-controlled front suspension system, known as "Hydrolink", which Tyrrell had been testing since February 1995. It used a 3-litre version of the Yamaha V10, which had been raced the previous year.

The team retained all its 1994 backers including Mild Seven, BP, Fondmetal, Calbee, Club Angle and Zent. This was partly helped by the fact that new team driver Mika Salo brought $3 million with him to the team which resulted in their new sponsor Nokia. Ukyo Katayama, who had driven for the team since 1993, remained on the roster.

After an impressive  showing with the simple but effective 022, 1995 was a huge disappointment for the team.  The 023 chassis proved to be very mediocre and the team's innovative "Hydrolink" suspension was rendered ineffective due to its deficiencies. The Hydrolink suspension was eventually removed from the 023 at mid-season.

Racing history

Salo was impressive in his first full season of F1, scoring all of the team's total of five points.  He could have done even better, holding third place at the season-opening Brazilian GP before spinning back to seventh due to cramp.  He was also set for points at the next race, but was taken out by backmarker Aguri Suzuki.  As such, the Finn had to wait until the second half of the season to score his first points.

He was disadvantaged by the new higher cockpit sides as a short driver, but was still outclassed by his inexperienced team-mate. Test driver Gabriele Tarquini stood in for Katayama at the Nürburgring after the Japanese was injured in an acrobatic startline crash at Estoril.

Tyrell eventually finished ninth in the Constructors' Championship, with five points, behind Footwork due to Gianni Morbidelli's third-place finish at Adelaide.

Complete Formula One results
(key)

References

1995 Formula One season cars
Tyrrell Formula One cars